Walden's Puddle is a wildlife rehabilitation & education center located in Joelton, Tennessee, a suburb just outside Nashville.

It provides care and treatment to sick, injured and orphaned native Tennessee wildlife and is the only professionally staffed wildlife rehabilitation and education facility in Middle Tennessee.  They do not charge for services.

External links

Charities based in Tennessee
Geography of Davidson County, Tennessee